The orange-sided bar-lipped skink (Eremiascincus douglasi) is a species of skink found in the Northern Territory in Australia.

References

Eremiascincus
Reptiles described in 1967
Taxa named by Glen Milton Storr